Martin McHugh may refer to:

Martin McHugh (Gaelic footballer), Gaelic footballer, manager and media pundit
Martin McHugh (bowls), Northern Irish lawn bowler
Martin McHugh (psychologist), Irish psychologist